A Cinderella Story is a soundtrack album to the 2004 film of the same name. It was released on July 13, 2004, by Hollywood Records. It includes 3 new songs by Hilary Duff including her single cover of "Our Lips Are Sealed" with her sister Haylie Duff. It also includes 2 of her previous released songs from her 2003 album Metamorphosis which are "Anywhere But Here" and the Target bonus track "Girl Can Rock".

Singles
"Our Lips Are Sealed" was released as the only single from the soundtrack on June 5, 2004. As of July 27, 2014, the song had sold 161,000 copies in the United States.

Critical response

Heather Phares of AllMusic gave a positive review of the soundtrack, awarding it three out of five stars. She praised Duff's songs, noting that they "display a little more edge and depth while still remaining appropriate for a teen pop singer like Duff and her audience," and added that they were complemented by the contributions from other artists. She claimed that Duff contributing to the majority of the album would "tide [her] fans over" before the release of her eponymous third album. Phares finalized her review stating, "A Cinderella Story is an admittedly lightweight but solidly entertaining soundtrack that delivers exactly what its audience wants from it."

Track listing

Notes
 signifies an executive producer
 signifies a vocal producer and executive producer

Charts

Weekly charts

Year-end charts

Certifications

Release history

References 

Hilary Duff albums
Albums produced by Chico Bennett
2004 soundtrack albums
Hollywood Records soundtracks
Romance film soundtracks
Comedy film soundtracks
A Cinderella Story (film series)